John Gwako (born 4 September 1978) is a Kenyan long-distance runner.

He won the Marseille-Cassis Classique Internationale half-marathon in 1997, setting a course record of 1:00:27.

After suffering from injuries for quite some time, he is now planning a comeback in 2014.

Achievements

Personal bests
Half marathon - 1:01:00 hrs (1997) 
Marathon - 2:12:30 hrs (2005)

References

External links

1978 births
Living people
Kenyan male long-distance runners
Kenyan male cross country runners
20th-century Kenyan people
21st-century Kenyan people